We Are Not An Island is the debut album by Vib Gyor, released worldwide on 25 May 2009, exclusively on iTunes.

To tie in with the release, iTunes promoted a new version of "Fallen" as single of the week.

The album was released as a CD on 1 July 2009, with the first 500 copies being signed by the band. As the band were without a record label, the CD was initially only be available through their website

Track listing

References

2009 albums